Nationality words link to articles with information on the nation's poetry or literature (for instance, Irish or France).

Events
1005 - 1007:
 Compilation of the Shūi Wakashū, the third imperial Japanese poetry anthology

Births
Death years link to the corresponding "[year] in poetry" article. There are conflicting or unreliable sources for the birth years of many people born in this period; where sources conflict, the poet is listed again and the conflict is noted:

1001:
 Wallada bint al-Mustakfi (died 1091), Arab Andalusian poet of Arabic language

1002:
 Mei Yaochen (died 1060), Song poet

1003:
 Ibn Zaydún (died 1071), Arabic poet

1004:
 Nasir Khusraw (died 1088), Persian poet

1006:
 Khwaja Abdullah Ansari (died 1088), Afghan poet, also known as "Shaikul Mashayekh" (Arabic: شیخ المشایخ) [Master of (Sufi) Masters]

1007:
 Ouyang Xiu (died 1072), Chinese statesman, historian, essayist and poet of the Song Dynasty

1009:
 Qatran Tabrizi (died 1072), Persian poet

Deaths
Birth years link to the corresponding "[year] in poetry" article:

1001:
 Wang Yucheng (born 954), Song poet

1007:
 Badi' al-Zaman al-Hamadhani (born 967), master of Arabic prose

1008:
 Gunnlaugr ormstunga (born 983), Icelandic skald, from injuries sustained after defeating skald Hrafn Önundarson in battle.

See also

 Poetry
 11th century in poetry
 11th century in literature
 List of years in poetry

Other events:
 Other events of the 12th century
 Other events of the 13th century

11th century:
 11th century in poetry
 11th century in literature

Notes

11th-century poetry
Poetry